Robert Byrne may refer to:

Robert Byrne
 Robert Byrne (Australian politician) (1821–1909), politician in Victoria, Australia
 Robert Byrne (author) (1930–2016), sports author, novelist
 Robert Byrne (bishop) (born 1956), British Roman Catholic bishop
 Robert Byrne (chess player) (1928–2013), American chess player
 Robert Byrne (hurler) (born 1997), Irish hurler
 Robert Byrne (North Dakota politician) (1886–1967), North Dakota Republican politician
 Robert Byrne (songwriter) (1954–2005), American songwriter
 Robert Byrne (trade unionist) (1899–1919), Irish trade unionist

Bobby Byrne
 Bobby Byrne (baseball) (1884–1964), third baseman in Major League Baseball
 Bobby Byrne (cinematographer) (1932–2017), American cinematographer
 Bobby Byrne (musician) (1918–2006), trombonist
John Edgar Byrne, known as "Bobby Byrne", Australian journalist.

See also
 Bob Byrne, comics writer, artist, and publisher